Achaea or Achaia, sometimes transliterated from Greek as Akhaia (Akhaïa ), is one of the regional units of Greece. It is part of the region of Western Greece and is situated in the northwestern part of the Peloponnese peninsula. The capital is Patras which is the third largest city in Greece.

Geography

Achaea is bordered by Elis to the west and southwest, Arcadia to the south, and Corinthia to the east and southeast. The Gulf of Corinth lies to its northeast, and the Gulf of Patras to its northwest. The mountain Panachaiko (1926 m), though not the highest of Achaea, dominates the coastal area near Patras. Higher mountains are found in the south, such as Aroania (2341 m) and Erymanthos (2224 m). Other mountain ranges in Achaea are Skollis, Omplos, Kombovouni and Movri. Its main rivers ordered from west to east are the Larissos, Tytheus, Peiros, Charadros, Selinountas and Vouraikos. Most of the forests are in the mountain ranges, though several are in the plains including the extreme west. There are grasslands around the mid-elevation areas and barren lands in the highest areas.

Climate
Achaea has hot summers and mild winters. Sunny days dominate during the summer months in areas near the coast, while the summer can be cloudy and rainy in the mountains. Snow is very common during the winter in the mountains of Erymanthos, Panachaiko and Aroania. Winter high temperatures are around the 10 °C mark throughout the low-lying areas.

Administration

The regional unit Achaea is subdivided into 5 municipalities. These are (number as in the map in the infobox):
Aigialeia (2)
Erymanthos (4)
Kalavryta (5)
Patras (Patra, 1)
West Achaea (Dytiki Achaia, 3)

Prefecture
As a part of the 2011 Kallikratis government reform, the regional unit Achaea was created out of the former prefecture Achaea. The prefecture had the same territory as the present regional unit. At the same time, the municipalities were reorganised, according to the table below.

Provinces
Province of Aigialeia - Aigio
Province of Kalavryta - Kalavryta
Province of Patras - Patras
Note: Provinces no longer hold any legal status in Greece.

History

Classical Antiquity

The Achaean League was a Hellenistic-era confederation of city states in Achaea, founded in 280/281 BC. It later grew until it included most of Peloponnese, much reducing the Macedonian rule in the area.

After Macedon's defeat by the Romans in the early 2nd century BC, the League was able to finally defeat a heavily weakened Sparta and take control of the entire Peloponnese. However, as the Roman influence in the area grew, the league erupted into an open revolt against Roman domination, in what is known as Achaean War. The Achaeans were defeated at the Battle of Corinth (146 BC), and the League was dissolved by the Romans.

In AD 51/52, Lucius Junius Gallio Annaeanus was proconsul of Achaea, and is portrayed (under the name "Gallio") in the book of the Acts of the Apostles, in the Bible, as presiding over the trial of the Apostle Paul in Corinth.

Medieval history

Achaea remained a province of the Byzantine Empire after the fall of the Western Roman Empire. In the 6th and 7th centuries, Slavs invaded Greece and reached the Peloponnese, settling there. The coastal cities remained largely under Byzantine control, and a Siege of Patras in 805/807 failed. By the end of the 9th century, the whole peninsula was firmly under Byzantine control again, forming the Theme of the Peloponnese. 

After the Fourth Crusade several new Crusader states were founded in Greece. One of these was the Principality of Achaea, founded in 1205, which like the Roman province covered a much larger area than the Achaea region. The Achaea region was among the core territories of the Principality, with four baronies: the extensive Barony of Patras, the Barony of Vostitsa, the Barony of Chalandritsa, and the Barony of Kalavryta. Patras, under the powerful Latin Archbishopric of Patras, over time became a semi-autonomous domain under the protection of Venice and the Holy See. Although Kalavryta was lost to the Byzantine Greeks already by the end of the 13th century, the other baronies survived until the Principality of Achaea was conquered by the Byzantine Empire in 1430, and became part of the Despotate of the Morea.

The Despotate of the Morea fell to the Ottoman Empire in 1460. As a part of the Morean War, the Republic of Venice captured Achaea in 1687 and held it until 1715, when the Ottomans recaptured the Peloponnese. Under Ottoman rule, Achaea was part of the Morea Eyalet.

Modern history
In the Greek War of Independence, Aigio was one of the first cities to be liberated by the Greeks and all of Achaea was liberated by the end of 1821. Achaea produced several heroes including Kanaris, Zaimis and Roufos and prime ministers of Greece including Andreas Michalakopoulos as well as some head of states.

In the first administrative subdivision of independent Greece, Achaea was part of the Achaea and Elis Prefecture. This was divided into the prefectures of Achaea and Elis in 1899. Achaea and Elis were reunited in 1909, and split again in 1930.

Achaea saw an influx of refugees that arrived from Asia Minor during the Greco Turkish War of 1919-1922. Tens of thousands were relocated to their camps in the suburbs of Patras and a few villages mainly within the coastline. One of the camps was named Prosfygika.

Population

Achaea today has about one-third of the population of the Peloponnese. Patras, the capital of Achaea, is the third largest city in Greece, behind Athens and Thessaloniki. Two-thirds of the Achaean population live near Patras, and more than half within the city limits. The main industrial areas are around Patras.

Main towns and cities

The main cities and towns of Achaea are (ranked by 2011 census population):
Patras 269,034
Aigio 40,664
Kato Achaia 11,880

Culture

The monastery Agia Lavra is situated a few kilometres west of Kalavryta on the top of a hill. 12 to 20 km east, is Cave Lakes, with lakes inside. The length is around 300 to 500 m.

The mountain hosts the most modern Greek telescope, named Aristarchus (after the ancient Greek astronomer - Aristarchus of Samos) and operated by the National Observatory of Athens. A narrow gauge railway track runs for 30 km, mainly as a tourist attraction. The track begins near Kalavryta and ends off Diakopto.

Economy
Patras is one of the main industrial and commerce centers in Greece. Temeni is a place where the spring water Avra (Άυρα) is manufactured. It is owned by Tria Epsilon, a division of The Coca-Cola Company and a parent. There is a small oil refinery near Rio. Athenian brewery has the largest production facility of the company in Patra.

Transport

Roads
The main highways are:
Ionia Odos (A5, part of E55): Rio - Antirrio - Arta - Ioannina
Greek National Road 8, old road Athens - Corinth - Rio - Patras
Greek National Road 8A (part of E55 and E65): Athens - Corinth - Rio - Patras
Greek National Road 9 (part of E55): Patras - Pyrgos - Kyparissia - Pylos
Greek National Road 31: Aigio - Kalavryta
Greek National Road 33: Patras - Tritaia - Lampeia - Vlacherna

Bus
Intercity bus transport is provided by KTEL Achaias. The main bus terminal is in the city of Patras.

Rail
Achaea is served by both the Patras Suburban Railway on the Patras–Kyparissia line to Patras and Athens Suburban Railway on the Athens Airport–Patras line from Aigio to Athens. Both lines, as yet, do not meet.

Communications

Newspapers, fanzines and others

Current newspapers
Achagiotika Nea - Kato Achaia
Allagi - Patras
Elliniki Dimokratia - Patras
Epi ta proso - Patras
Evdomada - Patras
Filodimos - Aigio
Frouros tis Anatolikis Aigialeias - Akrata and eastern Aigaleia
Ta Gegonota tis Achaias - Achaea
I Gnomi - Patras
Imera - Patras
Imerisios Kyrix - Patras
Kosmos tis Patras - Patras
Paraliaki - Patras
Patraiki Evdomada - Patras
Politis ton Patron - Patras - political
Proodos - Patras
Proti tis Aigaleias - Aigio and Aigaleia
Simerini - Patras
Splats - a fanzine based in Patras
Sport Week - Patras - sports
Sportivo west - Patras - sports
Styx - Akrata
Symvoulos Epocheiriseon - Patras

Ceased and defunct newspapers
Achaikos Kyrix - an older newspaper of Patras
Tachydromos tis Anatolis - Patras, one of the few newspapers that were only published in French

Radio
ERA Patras - Rio
Super B - Patras
Top FM - 93 FM
Ionion FM - 95.8 FM
Radio Gamma - 96 FM
MFM
Radio Aigio - 99.2 FM
You FM - 100.1 FM (launched in 2006/2007)
Mojo FM - 107.9 FM

Television
Achaia Channel - Patrast
Patra TV - Patras
Super B - Patras
Tele Con - extinct
Tele Time - regional
AXION - Aigio

Companies
Achaiki
Kronos Supermarkets - Patras

Sports

There are two skiing resorts, one on the Panachaicus west of the mountain top (elevation around 1700 m) east of Patras, it will be Nafpaktos's closest because of the new bridge (mid-2004) and the other on Aroania, sometimes still called Chelmos, near Kalavrita. It is Kalavrita's closest resort.

Sporting teams
Division rankings were as of the 2005-06 season for most teams, for football (soccer), they are run by the Achaea Football Clubs Association:

Teams with multiple sporting clubs
Panegialios F.C. - Aigio - second division
Achaios Saravali Patras - Saravali - fourth division
Anagennisi/Aias Sympoliteia - Rododafni
Apollon Patras, A1 Basketleague
Atromitos Patras - fourth division
Diakopto AC - Diakopto - fourth division
Fostiras Ovrias FC - Ovrya, fourth division
Iraklis Patras - Patras, fourth division
NO Patras - Patras, A2 League/Water polo
NE Patras - Patras, A2 League/Water polo
Olympiakos Aigio - Aigio, fourth division
Olympiakos Kamares - Kamares - fourth division
Olympiakos Patras - Patras - fourth division
Ormi Patras - Patras, A1 League/ Women's Handball
Panachaiki - Patras, third division
E.A. Patras - Patras, third division/Volleyball
Spartakos Ovrya - Ovrya - third division (as of 2007)
Thyella Patras F.C. - Patras, third division
A.P.S. Zavlani - fourth division

Basketball only
Promitheas Patras B.C.
A.O. Skagiopouleio

Defunct and historic teams
Lefkos Asteras - Patras
Thriamvos Patras - Patras, now part of NE Patras

Notable people
Actor, mythological legend
Alexon, ancient figure
Timoleon Ambelas, a writer
Anchialus, mythological legend
Dimitrios Andrikopoulos-Boukaouris, Mayor of Patras
Antheia, mythological legend
Argyra, mythological legend
Autonous, ancient figure
Bolina, ancient figure
Bryson of Achaea, ancient figure
Anastasios Charalambis General and Prime Minister for one day in 1922.
Vasileios Christopoulos, an artist
Danielis, ancient figure
Kostas Davourlis Footballer of Panachaiki
Theodoros Deligiannis a Prime Minister of Greece
Ioannis Diakidis
Rena Dor, actress
Dymas, ancient figure
Eperatus, ancient figure
Eurypylus
Spyros Fokas, an actor
Asimakis Fotilas, a revolutionary leader
Panagiotakis Fotilas, a revolutionary leader
Giorgos Giannias, a revolutionary leader
Dimitrios Gounaris a Prime Minister of Greece
Helike, ancient queen
Ion, mythological legend
Antonios Kalamogdartis, a revolutionary leader
Athanasios Kanakaris-Roufos, a revolutionary leader
Panagiotis Karatzas, a revolutionary leader
Kostas Katsouranis Footballer - European Champion (Euro 2004)
Konstantinos Konstantopoulos a Mayor of Patras and Prime Minister of Greece
Andreas Kontogouris, a revolutionary leader
Nikolaos Kontopoulos
Christos Laskaris
Afroditi Laoutari, an actress
Dimitrios Maximos
Vassilis Makris, an artist
Memos Makris, an artist
Dimitrios Maximos a Prime Minister of Greece
Andreas Michalakopoulos a Prime Minister of Greece
Andreas Mikroutsikos
Betty Moschona, an actress
Molurus, ancient figure
Thanos Mikroutsikos, composer, former Minister of Culture
Myscellus
Kostis Palamas national Greek poet
George Papandreou (senior) a Prime Minister of Greece
Georgios Papadopoulos Leader of the military junta
Georgios Papandreou (historian), an unrelated historian and linguist
Anagnostis Petimezas, a revolutionary leader
Konstantinos Petimezas, a revolutionary leader
Konstantis Petimezas, a revolutionary leader
Nikolaos Petimezas (elder)
Angelos Roufos
Benizelos Roufos a Prime Minister of Greece
Ioannis Roufos
Selemnus, mythological legend
Panagiotis Skagiopoulos
Sokratis Skartsis, poet
Konstantinos Skourletis, mayor of Patras
Markos Sklivaniotis
Socrates of Achaea, ancient figure
Sostratus of Dyme, an ancient figure
Sostratus of Pellene, an ancient Greek Olympian
Konstantinos Stefanopoulos  President of Greece
Epameinondas Thomopoulos, an artist
Dimitrios Tofalos Olympic Champion
Spyridon Vassiliadis, poet
Xenofon Verykios
Dimitrios Votsis, mayor of Patras
Spyros Vrettos, poet
Alexandros Zaimis a Prime Minister and President of Greece

See also
Achaea (constituency)

References

 
Prefectures of Greece
Regional units of Western Greece
Peloponnese